Bradley Robbins (born 12 January 1985) is an Australian basketball coach and former player who is most known for his time spent in the National Basketball League (NBL) with the Perth Wildcats. He currently serves as an assistant coach with the Perth Lynx of the Women's National Basketball League (WNBL).

Early life and career
Born in Melbourne, Victoria, Robbins played his junior basketball at Dandenong. He represented Victoria in national competitions in Under 14s in 1998, Under 16s in 2000 and Under 18s in 2001 and 2002. In 2002, he represented Australia in junior men's teams and was then a member of the World Championship winning Australian Emus Under 19 team in 2003.

Professional career

NBL
Robbins made his debut in the National Basketball League (NBL) with the Victoria Giants during the 2003–04 season. He scored 11 points in 13 games. For the 2004–05 season, he played for the Cairns Taipans and averaged 1.6 points and 1.1 rebounds in 25 games.

After not playing in the NBL in 2005–06, Robbins joined the Perth Wildcats for the 2006–07 season. He played 67 games in his first two seasons in Perth averaging 4.7 points, 2.2 rebounds, 1.2 steals and 1.9 assists a game, but was restricted to just three appearances in 2008–09 through injury.

In the 2009–10 season, Robbins formed a tremendous point guard duo with Damian Martin to help lead the Wildcats to the NBL championship and in 32 games he averaged 4.5 points, 2.3 rebounds, 2.1 assists and 1.1 steals a game. In the 2–1 grand final series win over the Wollongong Hawks, Robbins played through broken ribs, a calf tear and sore hips to drag Perth across the line. He was named co-captain of the Wildcats for the 2010–11 season and averaged 5.4 points, 2.3 rebounds, 2.1 assists and 1.1 steals a game. The 2011–12 season was his second as co-captain and he had career-high numbers right across the board with 7.0 points, 2.9 rebounds, 2.3 assists and 1.4 steals a game as the Wildcats lost in three games to the New Zealand Breakers in the grand final series.

Off-season wrist surgery forced Robbins to miss the first three weeks of the Wildcats' 2012–13 season, but upon returning to action, he managed just eight games before announcing his retirement from the NBL on 11 December 2012. He continued on with the team in an advisory role, but following an Achilles injury to Damian Martin in Game 2 of the Wildcats' semi-final series against the Wollongong Hawks, Robbins came out of retirement to fill in the back-up point guard role for the 2013 grand final series against the New Zealand Breakers. He played in both games of the Wildcats' 2–0 series loss to the Breakers, finishing his NBL career with 215 games and averages of 4.5 points, 2.1 rebounds and 1.7 assists per game.

Robbins revealed in January 2023 that a major depressive disorder was the reason for him retiring in 2012. He described his retirement press conference as a sham, telling the public his body had told him to retire when in fact other forces were the main factor.

SEABL and SBL
Robbins made his debut in the SEABL in 2001 with the Dandenong Rangers, playing one game. He was a regular member of the Rangers' squad in 2003 and played 21 games. In 2004 and 2005, he played for the Knox Raiders in the SEABL and won the Youth Player of the Year for the South Conference in both years.

In 2006 and 2007, Robbins played for the Willetton Tigers in the State Basketball League (SBL). Between 2011 and 2013, he played for the Wanneroo Wolves in the SBL and helped them win a championship in 2011 and reach another grand final in 2013. He did not play in 2014 but returned to the Wolves in 2015 for a short stint.

Robbins came out of retirement to play for the Rockingham Flames in the 2019 SBL season. He came into the season six kilograms lighter than he was when he was with the Wildcats, but a hamstring injury suffered during pre-season forced him to miss the start of the regular season. He made his debut for the Flames in round nine, but soon suffered a career-ending Achilles injury. In 12 games in his final playing stint, he averaged 5.25 points, 2.75 rebounds and 2.33 assists per game.

Coaching career

In 2017 and 2018, Robbins served as assistant coach for the Joondalup Wolves women's team in the SBL. He was interim head coach for a large chunk of the 2018 season with coach Craig Friday unavailable due to his duties with the national wheelchair team.

During the 2021 NBL1 West season, Robbins served as an assistant under Ryan Petrik with the Rockingham Flames men's team, helping them reach the grand final.

In July 2021, Robbins was appointed assistant coach of the Perth Lynx for the 2021–22 WNBL season. He re-signed with the Lynx as assistant coach for the 2022–23 WNBL season in September 2022.

Personal life
Robbins is married to wife Bekki and he has three children, Charlie, Donovan, and Bowie. He is the brother-in-law and close friend of former Wildcats and SBL teammate Greg Hire, with the pair having both married sisters.

In 2013, Robbins started working part-time as a project officer at the Fremantle Police and Community Youth Centre (PCYC). The centre's Streetball program, which Robbins began co-ordinating, was developed in 2012 to combat anti-social behaviour in the area. Robbins also began studying psychology and counselling at Edith Cowan University in 2013.

In January 2023, Robbins revealed to the public via The West Australian his long-time battle with depression and mental health issues since childhood which plagued him throughout his playing career.

References

External links
Perth Wildcats player profile
Old links related to Robbins
NBL stats
SBL stats
Brad Robbins Retirement Tribute

1985 births
Living people
Australian men's basketball players
Basketball players from Melbourne
Cairns Taipans players
Perth Wildcats players
Point guards
Victoria Giants players